Shosh is a former municipality in the Shkodër County, northwestern Albania. At the 2015 local government reform it became a subdivision of the municipality Shkodër. The population at the 2011 census was 80. Its territory coincides with that of the historical Shoshi tribe.

References

Former municipalities in Shkodër County
Administrative units of Shkodër